Nenkovo is a village situated in Kardzhali Municipality, Kardzhali Province, southern Bulgaria.

Population
According to the 2011 Bulgaria Population And Housing Census , the village of Nenkovo has 129 inhabitants, down from its peak of 883 people shortly after the Second World War. The village is exclusively inhabited by ethnic Bulgarian Turks (99%).

References

Villages in Kardzhali Province